Richard Knight Thompson, Jr. (July 9, 1920 – September 14, 2014) was an American racecar driver. A Washington, D.C. dentist by trade, he is known as "The Flying Dentist". He won numerous Sports Car Club of America (SCCA) championships and was inducted in the Corvette Hall of Fame. Thompson brought credibility to the Corvette as a world-class sports car. Active from the late 1950s until the 1970s, Thompson raced for several notable racers, including the factory Corvette team for John Fitch and Briggs Cunningham.

Thompson started racing in 1952 in one of the first 12-hour races at Sebring International Raceway. He drove to the track in his MG TD, and co-drove the car to an eighth-place finish. He caught Corvette engineer Zora Arkus-Duntov's eye in 1956, when Thompson was the only driver to compete in a production Corvette.  He won the SCCA championship in his Corvette in 1956, 1957, 1960, 1961 and 1962 in Classes A, B and C. He was selected to test drive a new Corvette Grand Sport at Sebring in December 1962. In 1963, he drove a Corvette Grand Sport to victory at Watkins Glen International. He took third place that year at Daytona International Speedway and won the GT class in 1970.

In 1967, Thompson won the 1000km of Spa with Jacky Ickx in the Gulf-liveried JW Automotive Mirage M1.

Thompson used his knowledge of the Corvette to write The Corvette Guide in 1958. He never made enough money to cover more than his expenses. He had never quit his dentistry business, so he decided to concentrate on that business full-time. He has raced occasionally in events since his retirement. He lived in Wellington, Florida as of October 2007. On September 14, 2014, he died of pneumonia at a hospice in West Palm Beach, Florida.

Honors
Dick Thompson was inducted in the Corvette Hall of Fame in 2000. Dick Thompson was inducted in the Le Mans Drivers Hall of Fame in 2013. He was inducted in the Sports Car Club of America's Hall of Fame in January 2018.

Racing record

12 Hours of Sebring results

24 Hours of Le Mans results

References

1920 births
24 Hours of Le Mans drivers
12 Hours of Sebring drivers
American dentists
People from Wellington, Florida
Racing drivers from Washington, D.C.
World Sportscar Championship drivers
2014 deaths
Deaths from pneumonia in Florida
20th-century dentists